In enzymology, an isoflavone-7-O-beta-glucoside 6"-O-malonyltransferase is an enzyme that catalyzes the chemical reaction

malonyl-CoA + biochanin A 7-O-beta-D-glucoside  CoA + biochanin A 7-O-(6-O-malonyl-beta-D-glucoside)

Thus, the two substrates of this enzyme are malonyl-CoA and biochanin A 7-O-beta-D-glucoside, whereas its two products are CoA and biochanin A 7-O-(6-O-malonyl-beta-D-glucoside).

This enzyme belongs to the family of transferases, specifically those acyltransferases transferring groups other than aminoacyl groups.  The systematic name of this enzyme class is malonyl-CoA:isoflavone-7-O-beta-D-glucoside 6"-O-malonyltransferase. Other names in common use include flavone/flavonol 7-O-beta-D-glucoside malonyltransferase, flavone (flavonol) 7-O-glycoside malonyltransferase, malonyl-CoA:flavone/flavonol 7-O-glucoside malonyltransferase, MAT-7, malonyl-coenzyme A:isoflavone 7-O-glucoside-6"-malonyltransferase, and malonyl-coenzyme A:flavone/flavonol-7-O-glycoside malonyltransferase.  This enzyme participates in flavonoid biosynthesis and isoflavonoid biosynthesis.

References 

 
 

EC 2.3.1
Enzymes of unknown structure
Isoflavones metabolism